Coventry Health Care, Inc. was a health insurer in the United States. It had 3.7 million medical members, 1.5 million Medicare Part D members, and 900,000 Medicaid members. In May 2013, the company was acquired by Aetna for $5.7 billion.

History
The company was founded in 1986 in Nashville by Phil Bredesen.

In August 1998, the company merged with Principal Health Care and moved its headquarters to Bethesda, Maryland.

In October 2000, the company acquired WellPath, the managed care subsidiary of Duke University Health System, for $20.7 million.

In October 2010, the company acquired MHP (Mercy Health Plans), an insurer with approximately 180,000 members in Missouri and northwest Arkansas.

In January 2012, the company acquired Children's Mercy's Family Health Partners.

In May 2013, the company was acquired by Aetna for $5.7 billion.

References

2013 mergers and acquisitions
Aetna
Companies formerly listed on the New York Stock Exchange
Health care companies established in 1986